Henry S. Tyler (September 20, 1851 - January 14, 1896) was Mayor of Louisville, Kentucky from 1891 to 1896.

Life
His grandfather, Levi Tyler, was a founding father of Louisville and successful businessman. His family continued to be wealthy and owned, among other properties, Louisville's Tyler Block. Henry Tyler attended Schatlock Hall Military Academy in Minnesota. He returned to Louisville to work as a clerk and bookkeeper and eventually established his own insurance company.

He was elected to Louisville's Common Council as a Democrat and then Mayor in 1891. He was re-elected in 1893 under a new city charter, which made him the first mayor elected to a four-year term. Tyler had been instrumental in drafting the new charter.

He died in office in 1896 and was buried in Cave Hill Cemetery. Louisville's Tyler Park and the surrounding neighborhood were named for him.

References
 
 

1851 births
1896 deaths
Mayors of Louisville, Kentucky
Burials at Cave Hill Cemetery
19th-century American politicians